Caulet is a French surname. Notable people with the surname include: 

 Auguste Caulet (1926–2011), French boxer
 François-Étienne Caulet (1610–1680), French bishop and Jansenist

French-language surnames